Lee Joo-heon (born October 6, 1994), better known by the stage name Joohoney and formerly mononymously known as Jooheon, is a South Korean rapper, singer, songwriter, producer, and actor. He is a member of the South Korean boy group Monsta X, which was formed through Mnet's survival show No.Mercy, under Starship Entertainment in 2015.

Career

2014: Debut and career beginnings 
Prior to his debut with Monsta X, Joohoney was part of a project group called Nu Boyz (along with #GUN, Shownu and Wonho) formed under Starship Entertainment in August 2014. The quartet uploaded multiple mixtapes to their company's YouTube channel and also performed at the opening show of Starship X concert in December 2014.

In December 2014, Starship Entertainment and Mnet launched a survival program called No.Mercy and Joohoney was selected along with six other participants (including Shownu and Wonho) as part of the new boy group Monsta X on the last episode of the show.

2015–2016: Show Me the Money 4 and Tribe of Hip Hop 
In January 2015, Joohoney released a collaboration track "Coach Me", with San E and Sistar's Hyolyn. Joohoney alongside group member Kihyun, participated in the soundtrack for the South Korean drama Orange Marmalade for the song titled "Attractable Woman", which was released in May 2015, and produced by Crazy Park and his team.

In June, Joohoney auditioned for the fourth season of Mnet's rap competition TV show Show Me the Money. He reached the third round and was eliminated in a 1-on-1 battle against rapper Lee Hyun-joon, but was later brought back for a second chance where he lost to One.

In April 2016, Joohoney was one of the producers for JTBC's hip-hop competition show Tribe of Hip Hop, appearing as the youngest producer on the show.

2017–present: Mixtape releases and other solo activities 
In January 2017, Joohoney released a solo music video for the song "Rhythm".

In August 2018, Joohoney released his mixtape DWTD. For the release, he released a music video for the track "Red Carpet", then a few months later, in October, he released a second MV, this time for the track "Should I Do". It charted in several countries, including charting at number eight and twenty-two on the weekly Billboards World Album and Top Heatseekers Album charts, respectively.

In February 2019, he changed to the stage name Joohoney, from using his given name Jooheon, for English-language activities.

In June, Joohoney appeared on Produce X 101 as a guest rap instructor for the trainees' first elimination battle.

In January 2020, Joohoney took a temporary break from Monsta X in order to focus on his mental health. He continued promotions again in late March, prior to the release of their Korean EP Fantasia X.

On October 9, Joohoney released his mixtape Psyche. He also pre-released the music video for the track "Intro: Ambition" on October 7, and then released the music video for "Smoky" simultaneous to the release of the mixtape. "Smoky" was described by Daniel Waters of MTV as an "emo-k-pop crossover", with Teen Vogue describing the chorus as "a sort of angsty rock 'n roll anthem" that both described as "cathartic". On October 21, Joohoney released a music video for the title track "Psyche".

In December 2020, Joohoney collaborated with Lovelyz's Kei on the OST "Ride or Die" for the drama Run On. The song was released on December 23.

In May 2021, Joohoney featured on the remake of the song "If You Love Me" by NS Yoon-G, originally released in 2012 with a feature by Jay Park.

On August 5, MBC's Idol Radio announced its second season, with Joohoney as a DJ for the show, alongside group member Hyungwon. The first episode aired on August 9, with the show streaming weekly through Universe and airing on MBC Radio.

In September, Joohoney appeared on the MU:PLY's Muziekwang Company as Kikwang's manager. It was a mockumentary web program that follows their journey as they open their own music agency. Muzie plays the company's CEO and top producer, while Kikwang plays a solo artist signed to the label.

In April 2022, Joohoney tested positive for COVID-19.

On October 14, Joohoney attended the 2023 S/S Seoul Fashion Week's Beyond Closet show organized by fashion designer Ko Tae-yong, held at Dongdaemun Design Plaza (DDP) in Seoul. On October 20, he also performed for MBC's Idol Radios first overseas concert Idol Radio Live in Tokyo, alongside group member Hyungwon and Got7's Youngjae, with several other artists, held at Tokyo Garden Theater in Tokyo.

On November 21, Starship Entertainment confirmed that Joohoney will make his acting debut through the Netflix original film K-Pop: Lost in America, which revolves around the story of a Korean boy group that heads to New York for its debut but ends up stranded in Texas with no money and mobile phones, and will be helmed by famous Korean film director Yoon Je-kyoon who directed Haeundae and The Negotiation, with filming in the U.S. starting from March to June 2023.

In January 2023, Joohoney was featured in a pictorial and an interview for the February issue of Cosmopolitan Korea. He also released the 2022 spring collection with the Korean street casual brand Born Champs. On January 20, Joohoney was selected to be a member of DdeunDdeun's new web entertainment show Bbam Bbam Social Club on YouTube, a program where each person chooses the drink he/she wants, drinks, talks, and interacts with each other, alongside Joo Woo-jae, The Boyz's Sunwoo, Aiki, Lee Yong-joo, and Park Se-mi.

Starting in late February, he will be a permanent MC of Mnet's M Countdown, alongside (G)I-dle's Miyeon, as a replacement to Nam Yoon-su.

In March, Joohoney will be part of JTBC's new variety show Korean Food Tray, a program that flies with Korean food trays anywhere in the world and makes Korean meal, alongside Chef Lee Yeon-bok and Hong Jin-kyung.

Public image and impact 
Joohoney has been attracting attention from global fans with his extraordinary producing ability, starting from their debut album up until now. He proved his outstanding musical ability by participating in the production of his first title track in 2021, earning a nomination from one of the most influential music awards in the United States. He strengthened his presence by featuring various artists, as well as active activities between groups and individuals, and developed his own unique world of music through his mixtapes. Joohoney is also showing versatility as a member for the team's "aegyo" and "anti-war charm", and has expanded his activities in various fields, including being selected as a DJ and as an exclusive model for various brands. Upon his limitless growth, he had established himself as an "all-rounder artist" with vocals, rap, and even producing.

According to Born Champ's CEO Bae Sang-in, there is a significant increase in sales, thanks to strengthening marketing, including the selection of Monsta X's Joohoney as a brand model. Starting with the 2022 S/S season, the brand, which has presented a collection of perfect chemistry for each season with Joohoney, is expected to increase its performance by 30-40% compared to the previous year. Their winter collection, unveiled on October 6, as soon as it was released, the main product became the number one product in Musinsa. They lined up the rankings throughout the opening day, causing an explosive response. When launching a new collection on his birthday, he caught both issues and sales.

Joohoney started producing and working on external songs, for then label mates Boyfriend's lead single "Star", from the group's fifth EP Never End, as well as songs for Mad Clown. He also featured and produced the song "Ongsimi", for fellow group member Minhyuk. Joohoney also composed, wrote, and arranged the song "Jumper", for his label mate Cravity, from the group's debut EP Season 1. Hideout: Remember Who We Are.

Other ventures

Endorsements 
In July 2021, Joohoney was selected as an exclusive model of the Korean SPA brand SPAO's F/W season, in collaboration with the Korean brands and customers' lifestyle platform Musinsa.

In February 2022, he became one of the faces of the Korean cosmetic and skincare brand Olive Young's Vegan Beauty campaign, alongside group member Minhyuk and labelmate Ive's Liz. In March, Joohoney became the new face of the Korean street casual brand Born Champs, unveiling the 2022 spring collection through SNS. 

In January 2023, Joohoney participated in the PepsiCo's carbonated soft drink brand Mountain Dew's campaign, alongside Dynamic Duo's Gaeko and Big Naughty, in collaboration with Starship Entertainment.

Philanthropy 
In October 2021, Joohoney donated 00,000 through the idol fandom community service My Favorite Idol, on the occasion of his birthday on October 6. It will be delivered to the Miral Welfare Foundation and used as a fund for the disabled who are isolated due to COVID-19. He appeared on the cover of the Korean Beauty Magazines November issue, published by Public News, that also spreads Hallyu culture to the world and introduces fashion, beauty and life that Koreans love, with all proceeds from sales of the magazine will also be donated to the Korea Social Contribution Association, and 100% will be used for the development of Hallyu culture and the underprivileged.

Discography

Mixtapes

Singles

As lead artist

As featured artist

Collaborative singles

Soundtrack appearances

Other appearances

Music videos

Songwriting

Filmography

Film

Television shows

Radio shows

Web shows

References

External links 

1994 births
Living people
People from Seoul
Male actors from Seoul
Rappers from Seoul
Singers from Seoul
English-language singers from South Korea
Japanese-language singers of South Korea
Starship Entertainment artists
South Korean male idols
South Korean male rappers
South Korean pop singers
South Korean singer-songwriters
Show Me the Money (South Korean TV series) contestants
Monsta X members
Weekly Idol members
South Korean hip hop record producers
South Korean male singer-songwriters